Kyle Bagwell (born 1961) is an American economics professor.  He is known for contributions to industrial organization and international trade.

Education 
Bagwell received a B.S. in Economics and a B.A. in Mathematics, both from Southern Methodist University, in 1983; and a  Ph.D. in Economics from Stanford University, in 1986, working under the supervision of Michael H. Riordan.

Academic career 
Bagwell is the Donald L. Lucas Endowed Professor in Economics at Stanford University. He held previous academic appointments at Columbia University and Northwestern University.

Honors 
Bagwell was elected Fellow for the Econometric Society in 2005.

Research contributions and publications 
Bagwell has published over 50 papers in specialized economics journals, on topics including trade agreements; competition and cooperation under private information; collusion; advertising and pricing with asymmetric information. Several of these have been widely cited and reprinted in various scholarly collections. Together with Robert Staiger, he is also the author of The Economics of the World Trading System (MIT Press, 2002).

Professional and public service 
Bagwell served as Editor of the RAND Journal of Economics from 1996-2002.

References

External links 
 Kyle Bagwell's Homepage
 Stanford University Economics Department Homepage

1961 births
Trade economists
Southern Methodist University alumni
Columbia University faculty
Stanford University Department of Economics faculty
Northwestern University faculty
Fellows of the Econometric Society
Living people
21st-century American economists